The Dan Patch Award is an annual award created in 1985 by members of the United States Harness Writers Association (USHWA). The Association's website states that their members' determination is aided by input from the American Harness Racing Secretaries plus logistic expertise provided by the United States Trotting Association.

United States Harness Horse of the Year
American Harness Horse of the Year

Pacing horses
Dan Patch Pacer of the Year Award
Dan Patch Award for 2-Year-Old Pacing Colt
Dan Patch Award for 2-Year-Old Pacing Filly
Dan Patch Award for 3-Year-Old Pacing Colt
Dan Patch Award for 3-Year-Old Pacing Filly
Dan Patch Award for Older Male Pacer
Dan Patch Award for Older Female Pacer

Trotting horses
Dan Patch Trotter of the Year Award
Dan Patch Award for 2-Year-Old Trotting Colt
Dan Patch Award for 2-Year-Old Trotting Filly
Dan Patch Award for 3-Year-Old Trotting Colt
Dan Patch Award for 3-Year-Old Trotting Filly
Dan Patch Award for Older Male Trotter 
Dan Patch Award for Older Female Trotter

Individuals
Dan Patch Achievement Award
Dan Patch Owner of the Year Award
Dan Patch Breeder of the Year Award
Dan Patch Trainer of the Year Award (winner receives the Glen Garnsey Trophy)
Dan Patch Driver of the Year Award
Dan Patch Rising Star Award
Dan Patch Breakthrough Award (winner receives the Lew Barasch Trophy)
Dan Patch Caretaker of the Year Award
Dan Patch Broodmare of the Year Award
Dan Patch Humanitarian Award
Dan Patch Fan Award
Dan Patch Unsung Hero Award
Dan Patch Good Guy Award (winner receives the William. R. Haughton Trophy)

References

American horse racing awards
Harness racing in the United States